This is a list of cricketers who have represented Multan Sultans in the Pakistan Super League (PSL) since team's debut in  2018 season. Players are listed alphabetically using the standard naming format of their country of origin followed by the year(s) that they have been active as a Lahore player.

For a list of current players see the current squad.

A
 Mohammad Abbas (2018)
 Abdullah Shafique (2018)
 Ahmed Shehzad (2018)

B
 Darren Bravo (2018)

I
 Imran Tahir (2018)
 Mohammad Irfan (2018)
 Irfan Khan (2018)

J
 Junaid Khan (2018)

K
 Kashif Bhatti (2018)

P
 Kieron Pollard (2018)
 Nicholas Pooran (2018)

S
 Saif Badar (2018)
 Kumar Sangakkara (2018)
 Shan Masood (2018)
 Shoaib Malik (2018)
 Sohaib Maqsood (2018)
 Sohail Tanvir (2018)

U
 Umar Gul (2018)
 Umar Siddiq (2018)

V
 Hardus Viljoen (2018)

W
 Ross Whiteley (2018)

References

Multan
Multan Sultans